Nijō can refer to:

Places
, one of numbered east–west streets in the ancient capital of Heian-kyō (present-day Kyoto, Japan)
Nijō Castle, a castle in Nakagyō-ku, Kyoto 
Nijō Station (Kyoto), a train station in Nakagyō-ku, Kyoto
, a former town in Fukuoka Prefecture, Japan

People 
 Emperor Nijō (1143–1165), 78th emperor of Japan
 Nijō family, one of the five regent houses (go-sekke)
 Nijō Tameuji (1222–1286), also known as Fujiwara no Tameuji, poet and founder of:
 Nijō poetic school, a conservative school of Japanese waka (poetry)
Lady Nijō (1258–c. 1307), Japanese writer, author of The Confessions of Lady Nijo